The 2016–17 B.League season was the first season of the Japanese B.League.

B1 Regular season

B1 Playoffs

B1 Relegation playoffs

Sendai 89ers and Akita Happinets were relegated to B2.

B1 Individual statistic leaders

B2 Regular season

B2 Playoffs

Shimane Susanoo Magic and Nishinomiya Storks were promoted to B1. Tokyo Excellence and Kagoshima Rebnise were relegated to B3.

B2 Individual statistic leaders

B3 season

B3 First stage

B3 Regular season

B3 Final stage

B3 Individual statistic leaders

References 

2016–17 in Asian basketball leagues
B.League
B.League seasons
Basketball in Japan